Highland Park is a railroad station in Highland Park, Illinois, serving Metra's Union Pacific North Line. It is located at 1800 St. Johns Avenue. In Metra's zone-based fare schedule, Highland Park is in zone E. As of 2018, Highland Park is the 50th busiest of Metra's 236 non-downtown stations, with an average of 1,005 weekday boardings.

The station consists of two side platforms and a waiting room, with a ticket agent booth staffed on weekday mornings. Northbound trains stop on the west platform and southbound trains stop on the east platform. Trains go south to Chicago’s Ogilvie Transportation Center, and as far north as Kenosha, Wisconsin.

As of April 25, 2022, Highland Park is served by 29 inbound trains and 28 outbound trains on weekdays, by all 13 trains in both directions on Saturdays, and by all nine trains in each direction on Sundays.

On weekdays, seven outbound trains terminate at Highland Park, and six inbound trains originate from Highland Park.

Bus connections
Pace
  213 Green Bay Road 
  471 Highland Park/Northbrook Court 
  472 Highland Park/Highwood

References

External links

Metra - Highland Park station

Metra stations in Illinois
Former Chicago and North Western Railway stations
Highland Park, Illinois
Railway stations in Lake County, Illinois
Railway stations in the United States opened in 1963
Union Pacific North Line